The judo competitions at the 2018 Mediterranean Games took place between 27 and 29 June at the Cambrils Pavilion in Cambrils.

Athletes competed in 14 weight categories.

Medal table

Medalists

Men

Women

References

External links
 
 2018 Mediterranean Games – Judo

 
Sports at the 2018 Mediterranean Games
2018
Mediterranean Games